Preobrazhenskoye is a rural locality (a selo) in Beloselskoye Rural Settlement of Krasnogvardeysky District, Adygea, Russia. The population was 1469 as of 2018. There are 19 streets.

Geography 
Preobrazhenskoye is located 10 km south of Krasnogvardeyskoye (the district's administrative centre) by road. Beloye is the nearest rural locality.

Ethnicity 
The village is inhabited by  Kurds and Russians according to the 2010 census.

References 

Rural localities in Krasnogvardeysky District

Kurdish settlements